Cold Desert Biosphere Reserve is a biosphere reserve located in the Western Himalayas, within Himachal Pradesh in North India. Biosphere reserves are the areas of terrestrial and coastal ecosystems which promote the conservation of biodiversity with its sustainable use. There are over 738 biosphere reserves around the world in over 134 countries . The ministry of environment and forest provides financial assistance to the respective state governments for conservation of landscape, biological diversity and the cultural heritage. This region has the status of a Cold Desert biome. This region carries the status of a Cold Desert biome for two reasons, one is the leeward part of the Himalayas which is spared from monsoon winds and the other is its position at high altitude, on average 3000-5000 metres.

Geography

It includes:

 Chandra Taal  
 Kibber Wildlife Sanctuary
 Pin Valley National Park
 Sarchu

Location
The cold deserts of India are located adjacent to the Himalayan Mountains. They are not affected by the Indian monsoons because they lie in the rain shadow of the Himalayas.

Flora and Fauna 
Given the climatic conditions, there is significant biodiversity here. Some of the representatives of the flora are medicinal plants such as aconitum rotundifolium, arnebiaeuchroma, ephedra gerardiana, ferula jaeschkeana and hyoscymusniger. The fauna also has its representatives, such as woolly hare, Tibetan gazelle, snow leopard, Himalayan black bear, Himalayan brown bear, red fox, Tibetan wolf, Himalayan ibex, Himalayan marmot, Himalayan blue sheep, red billed chough, Chukar partridge, snow partridge, blue rock pigeon, snow pigeon, Himalayan snowcock, lammergeier, Himalayan griffon, golden eagle, rosefinch, et al. are found in the area.

See also
 Deserts of India
 Ecology of the Himalayas
 List of ecoregions in India

References

Biosphere reserves of India
Deserts of India
Environment of Himachal Pradesh
Protected areas of Himachal Pradesh
Protected areas with year of establishment missing